James F. Green  (May 22, 1854 – December 12, 1912), was a Major League Baseball third baseman who played in ten games for the 1884 Washington Nationals of the Union Association. He later played in the Southern League in 1885 and the Tri-State League in 1888–1889.

External links

1854 births
1912 deaths
Major League Baseball third basemen
Baseball players from Connecticut
19th-century baseball players
Washington Nationals (UA) players
Portsmouth Riversides players
Chattanooga Lookouts players
Macon (minor league baseball) players
Mansfield (minor league baseball) players
Columbus Buckeyes (minor league) players
Dayton Reds players
Canton Nadjys players
Wheeling National Citys players
Wheeling Nailers (baseball) players